Bobby J. Cox (born February 10, 1980) is a lieutenant colonel in the United States Army Reserve and a member of the South Carolina House of Representatives where he has represented the 21st District since 2019. He is a member of the Republican Party and a former Army Ranger.

Cox is Vice Chair of the House Medical, Military, Public and Municipal Affairs Committee and Chairman of the Military and Veterans Affairs Sub-Committee.

Life 
Cox was born in Spartanburg, South Carolina, and graduated from The Citadel, The Military College of South Carolina; as a senior he served as Regimental Commander, the highest ranking member of the South Carolina Corps of Cadets. Following the 9/11 Terrorist attacks, Cox joined the U.S. Army. 
 
As an Army Ranger, Cox served four combat tours in the Middle East with elite units as the 101st Airborne Division (Air Assault), 75th Ranger Regiment, and the 82nd Airborne Division. He was awarded the Bronze Star Medal, three Meritorious Service Medals, four Army Commendation Medals, four Army Achievement Medals, and the Military Outstanding Volunteer Service Medal. He also served as an Instructor at the U.S. Army Ranger School and was selected to serve as an U.S. Army Congressional Fellow. Cox continues to serve in the Army Reserve as a lieutenant colonel.

Cox was previously employed at Milliken & Company in Spartanburg and is currently employed by SIG SAUER as their Vice President of Government Affairs, where he oversees strategic program development for Capitol Hill, The Pentagon, State Department, and Federal Law Enforcement Agencies. On December 10, 2019, Cox was nominated by South Carolina Governor Henry McMaster to be the state's first Secretary of Veterans Affairs.
 
In addition to a BA from The Citadel, he has a Master of Business Administration from the University of North Carolina at Chapel Hill Kenan-Flagler Business School with a distinction in Leadership. He also holds a Master of Professional Studies in Legislative Affairs from George Washington University.
 
Bobby is married to Joscelyn Cox and they have two children and a Boykin Spaniel.

References

External links 
 Member Profile - South Carolina State Legislature

Republican Party members of the South Carolina House of Representatives
Living people
21st-century American politicians
1980 births
The Citadel, The Military College of South Carolina alumni
UNC Kenan–Flagler Business School alumni
George Washington University alumni
United States Army personnel of the Iraq War
United States Army colonels